Martavious Lee (born August 10, 1989) is an American football cornerback who is currently a free agent. He played college football at Utah.

Professional career

Baltimore Ravens
On May 8, 2013, he signed with the Baltimore Ravens as an undrafted free agent. On August 25, 2013, he was waived by the Ravens.

San Jose SaberCats
On October 4, 2013, Lee was assigned to the San Jose SaberCats of the Arena Football League. On January 2, 2014, he was reassigned by the SaberCats.

External links
Utah Utes bio
Baltimore Ravens bio

References

1989 births
Living people
Baltimore Ravens players
San Jose SaberCats players
Utah Utes football players